Yazan Mohammad Yousef Thalji (born 3 September 1994) is a Jordanian football player, who currently plays as a winger for Al-Shorta on loan from Al-Wehdat and the Jordan national football team.

International career
The first match Yazan played with the Jordan national senior team was against Thailand on 5 June 2016 at Bangkok in the 2016 King's Cup which resulted in a 2–0 loss for Jordan.

International career statistics

International goals

With U-23

References

External links 
kooora.com 
eurosport.com 

goal.com 

1994 births
Living people
Jordanian footballers
Jordan international footballers
Footballers at the 2014 Asian Games
Al-Wehdat SC players
Shabab Al-Ordon Club players
Al-Ahli SC (Amman) players
Shabab Al-Hussein SC players
Sportspeople from Amman
Association football wingers
Jordanian people of Palestinian descent
Asian Games competitors for Jordan